Vaikkojoki River is a  long river, which is in provinces of Northern Karelia and Northern Savonia.

The waters of Vaikkojoki River flows from Lake Vaikkojärvi to Lake Kaavinjärvi, from the municipality of Juuka to municipality of Kaavi. There are 27 rapids in Vaikkojoki River.

Lake Kärenjärvi, Lake Vihtajärvi, Lake Saarijärvi and Lake Retunen are the largest lakes in the area of Vaikkojoki River.

Tourism 
Vaikkojoki River is a versatile recreational and leisure area offering outdoor activities round the year. Most of the tourism enterprises of the area are located in Kaavi, Northern Savonia.

The tourism enterprises of Vaikkojoki area offer accommodation services which include holiday villages, cottages and  camping sites. The transportation services and hiring services (equipments for canoeing, fishing and skiing) are also available.

The program services include many kinds of activities: archery, biking, boating, canoeing, cross-country skiing, fishing, winter fishing, hiking, horse riding, berry picking, mushroom picking, sauna, shooting the rapids and walking with snowshoes. The local tourism enterprises sell the fishing permissions too.

Shooting the rapids 
In Kaavi it is possible to shoot the rapids on Vaikkojoki River in the spring and early summer. The expeditions, covering , are done in a purpose-made boat steered by a professional helmsman.

Canoeing Route 
The total length of the Canoeing Route of Vaikkojoki River is circa .

There are landing sites near Lake Lietukka, Makkarasärkkä, Kusiaiskoski Rapid, Rakkinekoski Rapid and Multivääränkoski Rapid. Some of the campfire sites are covered.

Fishing

Species 
The natural catch species of the rapids of Vaikkojoki River are the brown trout (Salmo trutta), the grayling (Thymallus thymallus) and the ide (Leuciscus idus). Stocked catch species are the rainbow trout (Oncorhynchus mykiss) and the grayling. The northern pike (Esox lucius) is also a catch species.

Fishing permits 
A fishing permit for Vaikkojoki River can be obtained e.g. from the local tourist enterprises. A fisherman 18 to 64 years old has to purchase also personal National fishing management fee (Valtion kalastuksenhoitomaksu in Finnish). The child under the age of 12 is allowed to fish with the same fishing permit of an accompanied adult. The special fishing permits for school groups are available.

The fisherman may purchase a fishing permit for a day, week or for the whole season. One of the fishing permits covers the whole area from Lake Vaikkojärvi, Juuka of Northern Karelia down to Sivinvirta Rapid, Kaavi of Northern Savonia. Usually the permit covers also the lakes of the area. Some fishing permits cover only certain part of the river.

Allowed fishing methods in the rapids are spin fishing and fly fishing. The amount of catch is limited. Fishing is not permitted in Kajoonkoski Rapid.

Protection status

Vaikkojoki River has been designated the status of a protected area enlisted in the Natura 2000 ecological network of the E.U.

Habitat types 
Vaikkojoki River is situated in Boreal Biogeographic Region. Protected area covers 258 hectares. The most typical habitat types are coniferous woodland (50% of the area), Western taïga (31%), Fennoscandian natural rivers (25%) and bog woodland (19%).

The other habitats of Vaikkojoki Natura 2000 Site are natural dystrophic lakes and ponds, active raised bogs, transition mires and quaking bogs.

Bird species
Black woodpecker (Dryocopus martius), common crane (Grus grus) and western capercaillie (Tetrao urogallus) are the biggest birds in the area of Vaikkojoki.

The green sandpiper (Tringa ochropus) and the common gull (Larus canus) are typical freshwater birds in the river habitat. Other bird species include the common chaffinch (Fringilla coelebs), the willow warbler (Phylloscopus trochilus), the tree pipit (Anthus trivialis), the common redpoll (Carduelis flammea),  the great tit (Parus major), the spotted flycatcher (Muscicapa striata), the red crossbill (Loxia curvirostra), the Eurasian treecreeper (Certhia familiaris), the wood warbler (Phylloscopus sibilatrix), the greenish warbler (Phylloscopus trochiloides) and the goldcrest (Regulus regulus).

References

Rivers of Finland
Landforms of North Savo
Tourist attractions in North Savo
Landforms of North Karelia
Tourist attractions in North Karelia
Natura 2000 in Finland
Juuka
Kaavi